Duncan is an unincorporated community in Mercer County, Kentucky, United States.

A post office was established in the community in 1842, and it was probably named for prominent citizen John Ray Duncan.

References

Unincorporated communities in Mercer County, Kentucky
Unincorporated communities in Kentucky